Shon Zalman Weissman (or Sean, ; born 14 February 1996) is an Israeli professional footballer who plays as a forward for La Liga 2 club Granada CF, on loan from La Liga club Real Valladolid, and the Israel national team.

An academy graduate of Israeli side Maccabi Haifa, Weissman made his senior debut for the club in 2014 before spending three seasons on loan with Israeli clubs Hapoel Acre, Maccabi Netanya, and Ironi Kiryat Shmona. In Maccabi Netanya, he enjoyed a particularly successful campaign which culminated in the club reaching promotion to the Israeli Premier League. In the 2019–20 season, while playing with Austrian side Wolfsberger AC, he became the club's first goalscorer in a European competition and was the Austrian Bundesliga's top scorer that season with 30 goals out of 31 matches.

Formerly an Israel youth international, Weissman represented the nation from under-17 level. He made his senior international debut in September 2019.

Early life and personal life
Weissman was born and raised in the neighbourhood of Kiryat Haim of the city of Haifa, Israel, to a family of Ashkenazi Jewish and Sephardi Jewish descent. His parents divorced when he was 13, and he lived with his mother Varda and his younger brother Shoval. His grandmother is a Holocaust survivor. Weissman is observant and does not play football on the Jewish high holiday of Yom Kippur. He was enlisted and has served in the Israeli Air Force to complete his mandatory military service.

He also holds a Portuguese passport, on account of his Sephardi Jewish ancestry, which eases the move to certain European football leagues.

On 22 May 2019, he married his Israeli girlfriend Eden ( Markovich), his highschool sweetheart. Their first daughter Alma Leah Weissman was born in August 2020.

Club career

Maccabi Haifa
Weissman started his career with Israeli hometown club, Maccabi Haifa. On 20 January 2014, 17-year-old Weissman made his senior debut in the Israeli Premier League match against Hapoel Be'er Sheva. He came off the bench in the 79th minute, replacing Ran Abukarat. He ended the season with 10 league appearances, while only appearing in two games in the following season.

2015–18: Loan spells
On 19 August 2015, Weissman signed for fellow Israeli Premier League club Hapoel Acre on a season-long loan from Maccabi Haifa. After scoring no goals in 18 appearances, the loan deal was cancelled in January 2016.

For the 2016–17 season, Weissman was sent on a season-long loan again, this time to second division club Maccabi Netanya. He managed to score 12 goals in 21 league appearances, helping Maccabi Netanya achieve promotion to the Israeli Premier League as they were crowned champions at the end of the season.

In the following season, Weissman made one appearance for Maccabi Haifa before being sent out on loan once again in August 2017, this time to fellow Premier League side Ironi Kiryat Shmona. In September 2017, in a league match against F.C. Ashdod, Weissman scored his first goal on the highest level of Israeli football in a 2–0 win for Ironi Kiryat Shmona. He made 26 league appearances for the club, scoring three times.

2018–19: Return to Maccabi Haifa
Following the expiration of his loan, Weissman returned to Maccabi Haifa. He made his first appearance in the season as a substitute in the league match against Maccabi Tel Aviv on 26 August, receiving a yellow card shortly after in a 0–2 loss. A few days later, on 1 September, Weissman scored his first Maccabi Haifa goal when he netted in a 2–0 home win over F.C. Ashdod. He ended the season with eight goals in 25 league appearances.

Wolfsberger AC
On 20 June 2019, Weissman joined Austrian Football Bundesliga club Wolfsberger AC, signing a two-year contract and being handed shirt No. 9. On 17 August, in the fourth round of the league, he scored four goals in a 5–0 home victory over SV Mattersburg. Before the match, he had scored in three consecutive league appearances for the Carinthian club.

On 19 September 2019, Weissman scored the first goal in a 4–0 win over German club Borussia Mönchengladbach in the Europa League group stage, Wolfsberger AC's first European goal ever. He finished the 2019–20 season with 30 league goals which made him the Austrian Bundesliga's top scorer.

Valladolid
On 31 August 2020, Weissman signed with Spanish La Liga club Real Valladolid until 2024. He became the most expensive signing in Real Valladolid's history at €4 million. He scored his first goals in his ninth game for Valladolid, a 3–2 home win over CA Osasuna.

After his first season ended in relegation, Weissman remained playing for Valladolid in the Segunda División. On 29 August 2021, he scored in a 2–0 win at CD Lugo before receiving a straight red card in the 38th minute. Over September and October, he netted in four successive games to go top of the goalscoring charts.

After one single season, his club Valladolid has managed to return to the top Spanish football division, the (2022–23) La Liga. On 5 September 2022, having recovered from a pre-season injury, he made his season debut in the 2022–23 La Liga during its fourth game week, coming on as a second half substitute for Real Valladolid and then scoring the winning goal in the 93rd minute against UD Almeria, earning his team a last-minute 1–0 home victory.

Loan to Granada
On 31 January 2023, Weissman was loaned to Granada in the second Spanish division, until the end of the season, with an obligatory buyout clause of 3 million Euros in case of the club promotion back to the La Liga. 

On 5 February 2022, He scored his first goal for Granada during his debut in the 4th minute of an away league match against Villarreal II that ended in a 2–0 victory.

International career
Weissman made his youth international level debut in 2011 for his native Israel. From 2017 to 2018, he was part of the Israel U21 national team.

Weissman made his senior debut with the Israel national team on 9 September 2019, in a UEFA Euro 2020 qualifier against Slovenia. He started the game and was substituted in the 61st minute. He scored his first goal for the national team on 4 September 2021 against Austria in a 2022 FIFA World Cup qualifiers match, that ended in a 5–2 home win for Israel.

Career statistics

International

Scores and results list Israel's goal tally first, score column indicates score after each Weissman goal.

Honours
Maccabi Netanya
 Liga Leumit: 2016–17

Individual
Austrian Bundesliga Top goalscorer: 2019–20
Austrian Bundesliga Team of the Year: 2019–20
Real Valladolid's Player of the Season: 2021–22

References

External links
 
 
 
 
 
 
 

Living people
1996 births
Israeli Ashkenazi Jews
Israeli Sephardi Jews
Portuguese Jews
Israeli people of Portuguese-Jewish descent
Citizens of Portugal through descent
Jewish footballers
Israeli footballers
Portuguese footballers
Footballers from Haifa
Association football forwards
Israel international footballers
Israel under-21 international footballers
Israel youth international footballers
Israeli Premier League players
Liga Leumit players
Austrian Football Bundesliga players
La Liga players
Segunda División players
Maccabi Haifa F.C. players
Hapoel Acre F.C. players
Maccabi Netanya F.C. players
Hapoel Ironi Kiryat Shmona F.C. players
Wolfsberger AC players
Real Valladolid players
Granada CF footballers
Israeli expatriate footballers
Portuguese expatriate footballers
Expatriate footballers in Austria
Israeli expatriate sportspeople in Austria
Portuguese expatriate sportspeople in Austria
Expatriate footballers in Spain
Israeli expatriate sportspeople in Spain
Portuguese expatriate sportspeople in Spain